Yuliya Ilinichna Rutberg (born July 8, 1965, Moscow, USSR) is a Soviet and Russian stage and film actress, and People's Artist of the Russian Federation (2016). She is a Laureate of the Russian theatre awards.

Selected filmography
 1989 —   Two Arrows. Stone Age Detective  as cave girl
 1990 —   Stalin's Funeral  as Dodik's mother
 1998 —  Makarov as Alyona
 2000 —   Empire Under Attack as Lyubov Azef
 2005–06  — Not Born Beautiful as Kristina Voropayeva
 2012 —   Anna German. Tajemnica białego anioła as    Anna Akhmatova  
 2013 —  One Particular Pioneer as Nadezhda Vladimirovna
 2015 —   Orlova and Alexandrov as   Faina Ranevskaya
 2021 —   Bender: The Beginning as   Madame Sokolovich
 2021 —   Bender: Gold of the Empire as   Madame Sokolovich

References

External links
 

1965 births

Living people
Actresses from Moscow
Soviet film actresses
Soviet stage actresses
20th-century Russian actresses
21st-century Russian actresses
Russian voice actresses
Russian film actresses
Russian stage actresses
Honored Artists of the Russian Federation
People's Artists of Russia